Heliciculture, commonly known as snail farming, is the process of raising edible land snails, primarily for human consumption or cosmetic use. The meat and snail eggs a.k.a. white caviar can be consumed as escargot and as a type of caviar, respectively.

Perhaps the best-known edible land snail species in the Western world is Helix pomatia, commonly known as the Roman snail or the Burgundy snail. This species, however, is not fit for profitable snail farming, and is normally harvested from nature.

Commercial snail farming in the Western world is typically done with Cornu aspersum (morphotypically divided into C. a. aspersa and C. a. maxima), formerly known as Helix aspersa. In tropical climates, snail farming is typically done with the African snail, which biologically does not fall in the family Helicidae, so the meat of which may not be called escargot.

History 
Roasted snail shells have been found in archaeological excavations, an indication that snails have been eaten since prehistoric times.

Lumaca romana, (translation: Roman snail), was an ancient method of snail farming or heliciculture in the region about Tarquinia. This snail-farming method was described by Fulvius Lippinus (49 BC) and mentioned by Marcus Terentius Varro in De Re rustica III, 12. The snails were fattened for human consumption using spelt and aromatic herbs. People usually raised snails in pens near their houses, and these pens were called "cochlea".

The Romans, in particular, are known to have considered escargot as an elite food, as noted in the writings of Pliny the Elder. The Romans selected the best snails for breeding. Fulvius Lippinus started this practice. Various species were consumed by the Romans. Shells of the edible land snail species Otala lactea have been recovered in archaeological excavations of Volubilis in present-day Morocco.

"Wallfish" were also often eaten in Britain, but were never as popular as on the continent. There, people often ate snails during Lent, and in a few places, they consumed large quantities of snails at Mardi Gras or Carnival, prior to Lent.

According to some sources, the French exported brown garden snails to California in the 1850s, raising them as the delicacy escargot. Other sources claim that Italian immigrants were the first to bring the snail to the United States.

Edible land snail species 

Most land snails are edible provided they are properly cooked. Their flavour varies by species and the way/method of cooking, and preferences may vary by culture. Only a few species are suitable for profitable farming.

"Escargot" most commonly refers to either Cornu aspersum or to Helix pomatia, although other varieties of snails are eaten. Lissachatina fulica, a giant African snail, is sliced and canned and passed off on some consumers as escargot. Terms such as "garden snail" or "common brown garden snail" are rather meaningless, since they refer to so many types of snails, but they sometimes mean H. aspersa.

 Cornu aspersum, formerly officially called Helix aspersa Müller, is also known as the French petit gris, "small grey snail", the escargot chagrine, or la zigrinata. It is native to the shores of the Mediterranean and along the coasts of Spain and France. It is found on many British Isles, where the Romans introduced it in the first century AD (some references say it dates to the early Bronze Age). In the early 19th century, the French brought it into California, where it has become a serious pest. These snails are now common throughout the U.S. It was introduced into several Eastern and Gulf states even before 1850, and later introduced into other countries such as Australia, South Africa, New Zealand, Mexico, and Argentina. C. aspersum has a lifespan of 2 to 5 years. This species is more adaptable to different climates and conditions than many snails, and is found in woods, fields, sand dunes, and gardens. This adaptability not only increases C. aspersum's range, but it also makes farming it easier and less risky.
It also is called the "Roman snail", "apple snail", "lunar", la vignaiola, Weinbergschnecke, escargot de Bourgogne or "Burgundy snail", or "gros blanc. Native over a large part of Europe, it lives in wooded mountains and valleys up to  altitude and in vineyards and gardens. The Romans may have introduced it into Britain during the Roman period (AD 43–410). Immigrants introduced it into the U.S. in Michigan and Wisconsin. Many prefer H. pomatia to H. aspersa for its flavor and larger size, as the "escargot par excellence. To date, H. pomatia, however, has not been economically viable for farming.
 Otala lactea is sometimes called the "vineyard snail", "milk snail", or "Spanish snail".

It inhabits Central Europe and was introduced into, and is now naturalized in, many U.S. states, from Massachusetts to California, and from Tennessee to Canada. Its habitat ranges widely from woods to dunes. It mainly eats dead plant material, but it likes nettles and buttercups, and eats dead worms and snails.
It is native to central and northern Europe. This species was introduced into Maine, Massachusetts, and New Hampshire in colonial times, but it never became established in these states. Its habitat varies, but C. hortensis is found in colder and wetter places than C. nemoralis. Their smaller size and some people's opinion that they do not taste as good make C. hortensis and C. nemoralis less popular than the larger European land snails.
It is found in Mediterranean countries and was introduced into Louisiana and Texas.
It is found in central Italy and from Yugoslavia through the Crimea to Turkey and around the Black Sea.
 Helix adanensis comes from around Turkey.
Its meat is highly prized. It is native to France, Italy, and other Mediterranean countries, and has become established in California and Louisiana. Sometimes known as the "burrowing snail", it is found above ground only during rainy weather. In hot, dry weather, it burrows  into the ground and becomes dormant until rain softens the soil.
Native to Sicily, it has been spread to several European countries, including England. This snail is a serious garden pest and is the "white snail" that California once eradicated using flamethrowers to burn off whole areas. In large numbers, up to 3,000 snails per tree, it can ravage a garden in 24 hours and a citrus or other crop in a few nights.

Their native range is south of the Sahara in East Africa. This snail was purposely introduced into India in 1847. An unsuccessful attempt was made to establish it in Japan in 1925. It has been purposely and accidentally transported to other Pacific locations and was inadvertently released in California after World War II, in Hawaii, and later in North Miami, Florida, in the 1970s. In many places, it is a serious agricultural pest that causes considerable crop damage. Also, due to its large size, its slime and fecal material create a nuisance as does the odor that occurs when something like poison bait causes large numbers to die. The U.S. has made considerable effort to eradicate these snails. The U.S. Department of Agriculture has banned the importation and possession of live giant African snails. However, they are still sought after as pets due to the vibrant "tiger stripes" on their shells. Giant African snails can be farmed, but their requirements and their farming methods differ significantly from those of the farming of Helix species.

Biology 
Understanding of the snail's biology is fundamental to use the right farming techniques. The snail's biology is therefore described here with that in mind.

Anatomy 
The anatomy of the edible land snail is described in Land snail.

Lifecycle 
General

Snails are hermaphrodites. Although they have both male and female reproductive organs, they must mate with another snail of the same species before they lay eggs. Some snails may act as males one season and as females the next. Other snails play both roles at once and fertilize each other simultaneously. When the snail is large enough and mature enough, which may take several years, mating occurs in the late spring or early summer after several hours of courtship. Sometimes, a second mating occurs in summer. (In tropical climates, mating may occur several times a year. In some climates, snails mate around October and may mate a second time 2 weeks later.) After mating, the snail can store sperm received for up to a year, but it usually lays eggs within a few weeks. Snails are sometimes uninterested in mating with another snail of the same species that originated from a considerable distance away. For example, an H. aspersa from southern France may reject an H. aspersa from northern France.

Helix pomatia

Snails need soil at least 2 inches deep in which to lay their eggs. For H. pomatia, the soil should be at least 3 inches deep to keep out pests such as ants, earwigs, millipedes, etc. Dry soil is not suitable for the preparation of a nest, nor is soil that is too heavy. In clay soil that becomes hard, reproduction rates may decrease because the snails are unable to bury their eggs and the hatchlings have difficulty emerging from the nest. The hatchability of eggs depends on soil temperature, soil humidity, soil composition, etc. Soil consisting of 20% to 40% organic material is good. Soil moisture should be maintained at 80%. One researcher removes eggs immediately after they are deposited, counts them, then keeps them on moist cotton until the eggs hatch and the young start to eat. Snails lose substantial weight by laying eggs. Some do not recover. About one-third of the snails will die after the breeding season.

Helix pomatia eggs measure about 3 mm in diameter and have a calcareous shell and a high yolk content. Eggs are laid in July or August, 2 to 8 weeks after mating, in holes dug out in the ground. (Data varies widely on how long after mating snails lay eggs.) The snail puts its head into the hole or may crawl in until only the top of the shell is visible; then it deposits eggs from the genital opening just behind the head. It takes the snail 1 to 2 days to lay 30 to 50 eggs. Occasionally, the snail will lay about a dozen more a few weeks later. The snail covers the hole with a mixture of the slime it excretes and dirt. This slime, which the snail excretes to help it crawl and to help preserve the moisture in its soft body, is glycoprotein similar to egg white.

Fully developed baby H. pomatia snails hatch about 3 to 4 weeks after the eggs are laid, depending on temperature and humidity. Birds, insects, mice, toads and other predators take a heavy toll on the young snails. The snails eat and grow until the weather turns cold. This is a response to both decreasing temperature and shorter hours of daylight. When the ground warms up in spring, the snail emerges and goes on a binge of replacing lost moisture and eating.

Helix aspersa

(Data varies widely due to differences in climate and regional variations in the snails' habitats.) Data varies from 30 to over 120 eggs, but high figures may be from when more than one snail lays eggs in the same nest.

In warm, damp climates, H. aspersa may lay eggs as often as five times from February through October, depending on the weather and region. Mating and egg-laying begin when there are at least 10 hours of daylight and continue until days begin to get shorter. In the United States, longer hours of sunlight that occur when temperatures are still too cold will affect this schedule, but increasing hours of daylight still stimulate egg laying. If warm enough, the eggs hatch in about 2 weeks, or in 4 weeks if cooler. It takes the baby snails several more days to break out of the sealed nest and climb to the surface. In a climate similar to southern California's, H. aspersa matures in about 2 years. In central Italy, H. aspersa hatches and emerges from the soil almost exclusively in the autumn. If well fed and not overcrowded, those snails that hatch at the start of the season will reach adult size and form a lip at the edge of their shell by the following June. If the environment is manipulated to get more early hatchlings, the size and number of snails that mature the following year will increase. In South Africa, some H. aspersa mature in 10 months, and under ideal conditions in a laboratory, some have matured in 6 to 8 months. Most of H. aspersa's reproductive activity takes place in the second year of its life.

Achatina fulica

One giant African snail, Achatina fulica, lays 100 to 400 elliptical eggs that each measure about 5 mm long. Each snail may lay several batches of eggs each year, usually in the wet season. They may lay eggs in holes in the ground like H. pomatia, or lay eggs on the surface of a rocky soil, in organic matter, or at the base of plants. In 10 to 30 days, the eggs hatch releasing snails about 4 mm long. These snails grow up to 10 mm per month. After 6 months, the A. fulica is about 35 mm long and may already be sexually mature. Sexual maturity takes 6 to 16 months, depending on weather and the availability of calcium. This snail lives 5 or 6 years, sometimes as many as 9 years.

Growth 
Within the same snail population and under the same conditions, some snails grow faster than others. Some take twice as long to mature. This may help the species survive bad weather, etc., in the wild. However, a snail farmer should obviously select and keep the largest and fastest-maturing snails for breeding stock and sell the smaller snails. By selecting only the largest, the average size of the snail may increase significantly in only a few generations. Most of the differences in growth are probably due to environmental factors, including stocking density. To whatever extent these differences are genetic, though, farmers generally breed large, fast-growing snails instead of small, slower-growing ones.

Several factors can greatly influence the growth of snails, including population density, stress (snails are sensitive to noise, light, vibration, unsanitary conditions, irregular feedings, being touched, etc.), feed, temperature and moisture, and the breeding technology used.

Helix aspersa requires at least 3 to 4% calcium in the soil (or another source of calcium) for good growth. Most snails need more calcium in the soil than H. aspersa. Low calcium intake slows the growth rate and causes the shells to be thinner. Calcium may be set out in a feeding dish or trough so the snails can eat it at will. Food is only one calcium source. Snails may eat paint or attack walls of buildings seeking calcium, and they also eat dirtsoil.

A newly hatched snail's shell size depends on the egg size since the shell develops from the egg's surface membrane. As the snail grows, the shell is added in increments. Eventually, the shell develops a flare or reinforcing lip at its opening. This shows that the snail is now mature; no further shell growth can occur. Growth is measured by shell size, since a snail's body weight fluctuates, even in 100% humidity. The growth rate varies considerably between individuals in each population group. Adult size, which is related to the growth rate, also varies, thus the fastest growers are usually the largest snails. Eggs from larger, healthier snails also tend to grow faster and thus larger.

Dryness inhibits growth and even stops activity. When weather becomes too hot and dry in summer, the snail becomes inactive, seals its shell, and estivates (becomes dormant) until cooler, moister weather returns. Some snails estivate in groups on tree trunks, posts, or walls. They seal themselves to the surface, thus sealing up the shell opening.

Peak snail activity (including feeding and thus growth) occurs a few hours after sunset, when the temperature is lower and the water content (in the form of dew) is higher. During daytime, snails usually seek shelter.

Values of the snail

Nutritional value 
The nutrient composition of raw snails (per 100 g of edible portion), according to information from the nutrient databank of France, is:

Energy: 80.5 kcal (337 kJ)
Moisture: 79 g
Protein: 16 g
 Available carbohydrates: 2 g
Dietary fiber: 0 g
Fat: 1 g
Magnesium: 250 mg
Calcium: 170 mg
Iron: 3.5 mg
Vitamin C: 0 mg

Biochemical content

Snail farming 
Successful snail culture requires the correct equipment and supplies, including snail pens or enclosures; devices for measuring humidity (hygrometer), temperature (thermometer), soil moisture (soil moisture sensor), and light (in foot candles); a weight scale and an instrument to measure snail size; a kit for testing soil contents; and a magnifying glass to see the eggs. Equipment to control the climate (temperature and humidity), to regulate water (e.g., a sprinkler system to keep the snails moist and a drainage system), to provide light and shade, and to kill or keep out pests and predators may also be needed. Some horticultural systems such as artificial lighting systems and water sprinklers may be adapted for snail culture. Better results are obtained if snails of the same kind and generation are used. Some recommend putting the hatchlings in another pen.

Four systems of snail farms can be distinguished:
 Outdoor pens
 In buildings with a controlled climate
 In closed systems such as plastic tunnel houses or "greenhouses"
 In addition, snails may breed and hatch inside in a controlled environment and then (after 6 to 8 weeks) may be placed in outside pens to mature.

Key factors to successful snail farming

Hygiene 
Good hygiene can prevent the spread of disease and otherwise improve the health and growth rate of snails. Food is replaced daily to prevent spoilage. Earthworms added to the soil helps keep the pen clean.

Parasites, nematodes, trematodes, fungi, and microarthropods can attack snails, and such problems can spread rapidly when snail populations are dense. The bacterium Pseudomonas aeruginosa causes intestinal infections that can spread rapidly in a crowded snail pen.

Possible predators include rats, mice, moles, skunks, weasels, birds, frogs and toads, lizards, walking insects (e.g., some beetle and cricket species), some types of flies, centipedes, and even certain carnivorous snail species, such as Strangesta capillacea.

Population density 

Population density also affects successful snail production. Some sources say that, for H. pomatia to breed,  is the maximum.

Snails tend not to breed when packed too densely or when the slime in the pen accumulates too much. The slime apparently works like a pheromone and suppresses reproduction. On the other hand, snails in groups of about 100 seem to breed better than when only a few snails are confined together. Perhaps they have more potential mates from which to choose. Snails in a densely populated area grow more slowly even when food is abundant, and they also have a higher mortality rate. These snails then become smaller adults who lay fewer clutches of eggs, have fewer eggs per clutch, and the eggs have a lower hatch rate. Smaller adult snails sell for less. Dwarfing is quite common in snail farming and is attributable mainly to rearing conditions rather than heredity factors.

Feeding 
The feeding season is April through October, (or may vary with the local climate), with a "rest period" during the summer. Do not place food in one small clump so that there is not enough room for all the snails to get to it. Snails eat solid food by rasping it away with their radula. Feeding activity depends on the weather, and snails may not necessarily feed every day. Evening irrigation in dry weather may encourage feeding since the moisture makes it easier for the snails to move about.

Put the breeding snails in the breeding pens in April or early May. Feed until mid-June when mating begins and the snails stop feeding. Snails resume eating after they lay eggs. Once snails have laid their eggs, the adult snails can be removed. This leaves more food and less crowding for the hatchlings.

Snails of the same species collected from different regions may have different food preferences. Some foods that snails eat are: Alyssum, fruit and leaves of apple, apricot, artichoke (a favorite), aster, barley, beans, bindweed, California boxwood, almost any cabbage variety, camomile, carnation, carrot, cauliflower, celeriac (root celery), celery, ripe cherries, chive, citrus, clover, cucumbers (a favorite snail food), dandelion, elder, henbane, hibiscus, hollyhock, kale, larkspur (Consolida or Delphinium genera), leek, lettuce (liked, and makes good snails), lily, magnolia, mountain ash, mulberry, chrysanthemum, nasturtium, nettle, nightshade berries, oats, onion greens, pansy, parsley, peach, ripe pears, peas, petunia, phlox, plum, potatoes (raw or cooked), pumpkins, radish, rape, rose, sorrel, spinach, sweet pea, thistle, tomatoes (well liked), turnip, wheat, yarrow, zinnia. They will eat sweet lupines, but will reject bitter lupines and other plants with high quinolizidine alkaloids. Snails also avoid plants that produce other defensive chemicals, defensive stem hairs, etc.

Snails usually prefer juicy leaves and vegetables over dry ones. If snails are fed vegetable trimmings, damaged fruit, and cooked potatoes, uneaten food must be promptly removed as it will quickly spoil. Bran may be supplied that is wet or sprinkled dry over leafy vegetables. The diet may consist of 20% wheat bran while 80% is fruit and vegetable material. Some growers use oats, corn meal, soybean meal, or chicken mash. Laying mash provides calcium, as does crushed oyster shells. Snails also may eat materials such as cardboard (but do not purposely feed it to them); they can eat through shipping cartons and escape. Snails may sometimes eat, within a 24-hour period, food equal to 10%, and occasionally as much as 20%, of their body weight. Active snails deprived of food will lose more than one-third of their weight before they starve to death—a process that takes 8 to 12 weeks. Estivating snails can survive much longer.

Supply calcium at least once a week if it is not available in the soil. It should not contain harmful salts or be so alkaline as to burn the snails. Mix calcium with wet bran or mashed potatoes and serve on a pan; this will keep any leftover food from rotting on the ground.

Some researchers use chicken mash for feed. A plastic pipe can be cut in half lengthwise to make two troughs which can be used as feeders for mash. Mix laying mash (used for egg-producing hens) into the feed to provide calcium for the snails' shells. Commercial chicken feeding mash is around 16% to 17% protein, from fish meal and meat meal, making it good for growing snails. Supplying mash to hatchlings might reduce cannibalism. Two feeds that snails like and that promote good growth are: (A) broiler finisher mash consisting of 7% broiler concentrate, 58% corn, 16% soya, 18% sorghum, 7% limestone flour (40% Ca); and (B) chicken feed (pellets) for layers consisting of 5% layer concentrate, 10%, corn, 15% soya, 20% sorghum, 44% barley, 6% limestone flour (40% Ca).

Pellets are fine for larger snails, but mash is better for younger ones. Pellets should be partially crushed if fed to young snails. Snails do not grow well if rabbit pellets are their primary diet. Snails show a distinct preference for moist feed. Easy access to enough water must be ensured if snails are fed dry mash.

Be sure to frequently clean the feed and water dishes. The amount of feed a snail eats depends very much on air humidity and on the availability of drinking water. Clean drinking water can be served in a shallow container to reduce the risk of the snail drowning. Some types of chicken waterers may be suitable. Other factors (e.g., temperature, light intensity, food preferences versus food supplied, etc.) also affect feeding. A compromise, until the optimum feed is found, is to feed half green vegetable material and half chicken feed/grain/animal protein.

Young of H. aspersa readily eats milk powder. Its rapid rate of assimilation promotes rapid growth.

Climate 
A mild climate  with high humidity (75% to 95%) is best for snail farming, though most varieties can stand a wider range of temperatures. When the temperature falls below , snails hibernate. Under  the snails are inactive, and under , all growth stops. When the temperature rises much above  or conditions become too dry, snails estivate. Wind is bad for snails because it speeds up moisture loss, and snails must retain moisture.

Snails thrive in damp but not waterlogged environments and thus a well-draining soil is required. Research indicates that water content around 80% of the carrying capacity of the soil and air humidity over 80% (during darkness) are the most favorable conditions. Many farmers use mist-producing devices to maintain proper moisture in the air and/or soil. Also, if the system contains alive vegetation, the leaves are to be periodically wet.

Soil
Snails dig in soil and ingest it. Good soil favors snail growth and provides some of their nutrition. Lack of access to good soil may cause fragile shells even when the snails have well-balanced feed; the snails' growth may lag far behind the growth of other snails on good soil. Snails often eat feed, then go eat soil. Sometimes, they eat only one or the other.

A well-functional soil should have these characteristics:
 Containing neither too much sand nor too much clay, as snails strive to dig into hard clay and sand dries out easily
 A 20–40% organic matter content - organic matter enhances cation exchange capacity of calcium and magnesium, which in turn stimulates growth.
 pH around 7
Calcium may also be set out in a feeding dish or trough so the snails can eat it at will. More advanced techniques involve the addition of polyacrylamide with the following concentration: 12.5 cm3 of a 160 g M.A./one preparation in 0.25 L/kg of water in dry soil. Such stabilization treatment helps the soil structure resist washing and allows regular cleaning without destroying the crumb structure of the soil that is beneficial for egg laying.

Soil care: A farmer must find a way to prevent the soil from becoming fouled with mucus and droppings and also tackle undesirable chemical changes that may occur in time.

Soil mix suggestions:
 peat, clay, compost and CaCO3
 leaf mold (at pH 7)

Phases in snail farming 
Some who raise H. aspersa separate the five stages: reproduction, hatching, young, fattening, and final fattening.

Depending on the scale and sophistication of a snail farm, it will contain some or all of below described sections which may or may not be merged with one and another. Each section has its particular values for the key factors to successful snail farming, described above.

Hibernation 
For future reproducers it is mandatory to hibernate 3 months.

Breeding 
Most breeders allow the snails to mate with one another on their own. If snails are kept in ideal conditions, breeding will occur at higher rates and have more success.

Hatchery and nursery 
When the snails have laid their eggs, the pots are put in a nursery where the eggs will hatch. The young snails are kept in the nursery for about 6 weeks, and then moved to a separate pen, as young snails do best if kept with other snails of similar size. Eight hours of daylight is optimal for young snails.

Baby snails are fed on tender lettuce leaves (Boston type, but head type is probably also good).

Cannibalism by hatchlings

The first snails to hatch eat the shells of their eggs. This gives them calcium needed for their shells. They may then begin eating unhatched eggs. If the snail eggs are kept at the optimum temperature,  (for some varieties), and if none of the eggs lose moisture, most eggs will hatch within 1 to 3 days of each other. Cannibalism also will be low. If hatching extends over a longer period, cannibalism may increase. Some eggs eaten are eggs that were not fertile or did not develop properly, but sometimes, properly developing embryos might be eaten. A high density of "clutches" of egg masses increases the rate of cannibalism, as other nearby egg masses are more likely to be found and eaten. Snail egg has 12 to 20 times the protein of lettuce. The protein helps the baby snails start developing quickly and be healthier. Snail egg is an excellent starter food for newly hatched snails, but they tend to only eat eggs of their own species.

Fattening/growing 
In this section, the snails are grown from juvenile to mature size.

Fattening pens can be outside or in a greenhouse. High summer temperatures and insufficient moisture cause dwarfing and malformations of some snails. This is more of a problem inside greenhouses if the sun overheats the building. A sprinkler system (e.g., a horticultural system or common lawn sprinklers) can supply moisture. Make sure excess water can drain.

Fattening pens may contain  pieces (or other convenient size) of heavy plastic sheets, hung from boards resting on a rack that lets the tips of the plastic sheets just touch the ground. The sheets give the snails a resting and hiding place. Feeders may be located on the rack that supports the plastic sheets.

A layer of coarse sand and topsoil with earthworms is placed on the fattening pen's bottom. The worms help clean up the snail droppings.

Snails that hatched the previous summer can be put in a chilled room for hibernation over winter. About 1 April, (adjusted for local climate), they are moved to the final fattening pen. In cases where there are several fattening pens, the smaller snails are placed in one, medium in another, large in another. One-third of a pound of H. aspersa snails require one square foot of pen. Snails lose weight when they estivate in summer, therefore some growers do not stock pens by weight but by count. For H. aspersa, 10 to 12 snails per square foot is the maximum.

Harvest and purging 

Snails are mature when a lip forms at the opening of their shell. Before they mature, their shells are more easily broken, making them undesirable. For H. aspersa, commercial weight is 8 grams or larger.

The fastest, largest, and healthy snails are selected for next-generation breeders. This is typically around 5% of the harvest. The remainder goes for sales.

Snail eggs may also be harvested and processed to produce snail caviar, but in order to do so systematically, special breeding units are created enhancing easy harvest of the eggs.

Types of farms, or sections thereof

Open air farms 
Enclosures for snails are usually long and thin instead of square. This allows the workers to walk around (without harming the snails) and reach into the whole pen. The enclosure may be a trough with sides made of wood, block, fiber cement sheets, or galvanized sheet steel. Cover it with screen or netting. The covering confines the snails and keeps out birds and other predators. Fencing made of galvanized metal or hard-plastic sheets helps keep out some predators. A cover will protect against heavy rain. Shade (which may be a fine mesh screen) on warm winter days helps keep the snails dormant. 5 mm mesh or finer is used for pen screens or fences. Pens containing baby snails need a finer mesh.

Snails need hiding places, especially during the warm daytime. Plastic soil drainage pipes from the local garden center can be split in two lengthwise, and stacked one layer one way and the next layer at a right angle, providing shelter and also increasing by 50% the number of snails that can live in the pen.

The bottom of the enclosure, if it is not the ground or trays of dirt, needs be a surface more solid than screening. A snail placed in a wire-mesh-bottom pen will keep crawling, trying to get off the wires and onto solid, more comfortable ground.

Garden farms 
An alternate method is to make a square pen with a -square garden in it. Plant about six crops, e.g., nettles and artichokes, inside the pen. The snails will choose what they want to eat. If it has not rained, turn sprinklers on for about 15 minutes at dusk, unless the snails are dormant. A disadvantage to this method is that, if the snails are not mature at the end of the year, it is difficult to replant fresh plant crops in the pens.

Plastic tunnels make cheap, easy snail enclosures, but it is difficult to regulate heat and humidity. The tunnel will be  warmer than the outside, and snails become dormant when the temperature climbs above .

Indoor farms 
When snails are raised indoors under controlled conditions, reproduction varies according to the geographic origin of the breeding stock. For example, one researcher found that H. aspersa snails from Brittany seem to do better indoors than snails from another region. Another source recommends 75% humidity by day and 95% at night. In any event, avoid humidity higher than 95% (some say 90%) for any length of time. Excessive humidity can kill snails. Optimum temperature and relative humidity depend on several things, including the snail variety and even where breeding stock was gathered. For H. aspersa, the optimum temperature for hatching eggs seems to be  at 100% relative humidity. The soil must not be kept wet when the humidity is maintained at 100%, as the eggs will absorb water, swell up, and burst.

Fluorescent lamps can be used to give artificial daylight. Different snails respond to day length in different ways. The ratio of light to darkness influences activity, feeding, and mating and egg-laying. Eighteen or more hours of light apparently stimulate H. aspersa growth, while less than 12 hours inhibit it. Some snail species may associates the long hours of light with the start of summer—the peak growing season. Eighteen hours of daylight also appear optimal for breeding (mating and egg laying), but snails will breed in darkness.

Snails can be bred in boxes or cages stacked several units high. An automatic sprinkler system can be used to provide moisture. Breeding cages need a feed trough and a water trough. Plastic trays a couple of inches deep are adequate; deeper water troughs increase the chance of snails drowning in them. Trays can be set on a bed of small gravel. After the snails lay eggs each pot is replaced. (Set one pot inside another so that one can be easily lifted without shifting the gravel.)

In a typical example, the breeding box has concrete sides, soil with earthworms (to cleanse the soil) on the bottom, vegetation, curved tiles to provide shelter, feeders, and a chicken waterer. Mosquito netting or screening covers the top. These breeding boxes may be outside, or better results may be obtained when the boxes are inside a greenhouse—as long as the greenhouse does not get too hot or too dry. One researcher reported that in outdoor boxes, each breeder snail had about seven young. In greenhouses, each breeder snail had about 9 to 12 young. The researcher felt that under better weather conditions than those he had that year, each adult breeder snail would have produced 15 young snails.

Systems used in the farm

Fogging system 
A sprinkler system ensures moisture when needed and can be turned on at sunset rather than earlier in the day, when the moisture may drive snails out into hot sunshine. Temperature and humidity can be monitored using a thermometer and a hygrometer.

Anti-escape barriers 
Except for a box that is closed on all sides, and which is not economic for large scale snail farming, there is no anti-escape barrier that is 100% escape proof. The following methods are just a few systems, each of which has a varying degree of success:

 in an open pen, the top of the fences curve inward in a half circle; this works to confine the vineyard snail. However, H. aspersa can escape from such an open pen.
 Electric fence. [The electric fence top has two or more thin wires that are 2 to 4 mm apart. Each wire carries the opposite charge of the wire next to it. A battery or transformer is used to supply 4 to 12 volts to the wire. A snail will get a mild shock and retract when it crawls over a wire and touches a second wire.]
 Bend the fence top inward into a sharp "V" shape with about a 20-degree angle. The snail's shell will hit the bent-back part of the screen before the snail can reach up and start crawling on it. This blocks the snail, and the angled screen automatically compensates for the size of the snail.
 Suitable for solid wall enclosures, is to attach to the wall a horizontal piece of screen that projects inward several inches over the enclosure. The screen is made with material such as nylon monofilament that is moderately stiff and springy yet easily flexible. On the inside edge of the screen, the cross fibers are removed, producing a fringe several inches wide. When a snail crawls on the underside of the screen and moves out onto the fringe, his weight pulls several individual fibers down. One by one, another fiber gets away from the snail and springs back up out of reach. Eventually, the snail is dangling by a thread. The snail then falls, because the surface area is not big enough to crawl on.
The band can be bent so that part of it faces inward and is parallel to the pen floor. The band must not be placed very close to the ground, because rain may wash soil against the copper and leave a residue that may enable the snail to cross it. The bottom of the fence must be buried deep enough into the ground so that the snails cannot dig under it.

Processing/transforming snails 
Snails can be processed industrially (typically in 'factories') and as a craft (typically in 'kitchens'). Industrial processing of snails risks significant drop of the snail's quality, and with relatively high loss of material. The economies of scale that go with industrial processing, though, allows for profitable compensation. Processing by individual craftsmanship allows for much lower production, but product quality typically remains high.

Market developments

Ukraine
In 2015, the first snail farm opened in Ukraine. Production was, and remains, almost entirely for export, there being no consumer market for snails in the country. Production (in tonnes) was: 93 in 2018; 200–300 in 2019; and 1,000 in 2020, when the country had 400 farms. Exports were decimated in 2020, however, by lockdowns related to the COVID-19 pandemic.

United States 

U.S. imports of snails were worth more than $4.5 million in 1995 and came from 24 countries. This includes preserved or prepared snails and snails that are live, fresh, chilled, or frozen. Major exporters to the U.S. are France, Indonesia, Greece and China. The U.S. exported live, fresh, chilled, or frozen snails worth $55,000 to 13 countries; most were shipped to Japan, the Netherlands, and the United Kingdom. Individual statistics are not available for U.S. exports of prepared or processed snails from the U.S. Department of Commerce.

France 
The COVID-19 pandemic wiped out almost all sales in France in 2020. This was especially due to the cancelling of New Year's Eve, which comprises 70% of annual sales normally.

Restrictions and regulations

United States 
The same snails that some people raise or gather as food also are agricultural pests that cause considerable crop damage. Introduced slug and snail varieties tend to be worse pests than native species, probably due in part to the lack of natural controls. Snail pests attack crops ranging from leafy vegetables to fruits that grow near the ground, such as strawberries and tomatoes, to citrus fruits high up on trees.

The Federal Plant Pest Act defines a plant pest as "any living stage (including active and dormant forms) of insects, mites, nematodes, slugs, snails, protozoa, or other invertebrate animals, bacteria, fungi, other parasitic plants or reproductive parts thereof; viruses; or any organisms similar to or allied with any of the foregoing; or any infectious substances, which can directly or indirectly injure or cause disease or damage in or to any plants or parts thereof, or any processed, manufactured, or other products of plants..." The Animal and Plant Health Inspection Service (APHIS) categorizes giant African snails as a "quarantine significant plant pest." The United States does not allow live giant African snails into the country under any circumstances. It is illegal to own or to possess them. APHIS vigorously enforces this regulation and destroys or returns these snails to their country of origin.

Since large infestations of snails can do devastating damage, many states have quarantines against nursery products, and other products, from infested states. Further, it is illegal to import snails (or slugs) into the U.S. without permission from the Plant Protection and Quarantine (PPQ) Division of the Animal and Plant Health Inspection Service, U.S. Department of Agriculture. APHIS also oversees interstate transportation of snails. Anyone who plans to "import, release, or make interstate shipments of" snails, must complete APHIS's PPQ Form 526, Application and Permit to Move Live Plant Pests and Noxious Weeds. This form should be submitted to the state regulatory official. The state will process the request and make a recommendation to APHIS who will then make a decision.

Information on plant pest permits is available at APHIS's website .

The Food and Drug Administration (FDA) regulates the canning of low-acid foods such as snails. According to FDA, "establishments engaged in the manufacture of Low-acid or Acidified Canned Foods (LACF) offered for interstate commerce in the United States are required ... to register their facility ... and file scheduled processes for their products with" the FDA. This does not refer to fresh products.

Improper canning of low-acid meats, e.g., snails, involves a risk of botulism. When canning snails for home consumption, carefully follow canning instructions for low-acid meats to prevent food poisoning.

State laws also may apply to imports into certain states and to raising snails in a given state. Some states may want to inspect and approve facilities. Thus, anyone who plans to raise snails also should check with their state's agriculture department.

References

Further reading 
 Rebecca Thompson and Sheldon Cheney Raising Snails "National Agricultural Library, Agricultural Research Service, U.S. Department of Agriculture."
 
 Source of this article in Romanian
The U.S. Animal and Plant Health Inspection Service (APHIS) Standards for Snail-Rearing Facilities were revised March 2001 and are available on the APHIS website.

External links 
 Breeding and Growing Snails Commercially in Australia
 Escargot Passion
 
 Man and Mollusc's Data Base of Edible Molluscs
 Snail Farming in Africa

Agriculture
Gastropods and humans